Papyrus 49 (Gregory-Aland), designated by 𝔓49, is an early copy of the New Testament in Greek. It is a papyrus manuscript of the Epistle to the Ephesians, surviving in a fragmentary condition. The manuscript has been palaeographically assigned to the 3rd century. It was probably a part of the same manuscript as Papyrus 65. It came from Egypt and was purchased for the Yale University Library. Textually it is close to the Codex Sinaiticus and Codex Vaticanus. The text of the manuscript has been published several times.

Description 
The original size of the leaf was 18 centimetres in height by 25 centimetres in width. The leaf is damaged at the top, and six lines of its text have been lost. At the present time the leaf measures 20.3 cm by 13.3 cm. The lower and outer margins are 3 centimetres wide; the upper and inner margins were lost.

The manuscript has survived in a fragmentary condition and contains the texts of Ephesians 4:16-29; 4:31–5:13. According to Kurt Aland, it is one of three early manuscripts with the text of the Epistle to the Ephesians.

The text is written in one column per page of 29 lines, with 38 letters per line (average). It has no breathings (spiritus asper, spiritus lenis) nor accents. The double point is the only mark of punctuation. The letters are slightly inclined to the right; the writing shows the influence of cursive handwriting. It was written by a professional scribe. The nomina sacra are written in an abbreviated way.

The Greek text of this codex is a representative of the Alexandrian text-type. Aland ascribed it as "at least Normal text", and placed it in Category I. Bruce M. Metzger identifies it as Alexandrian text. According to Philip Comfort and David Barrett the manuscript shows a strong agreement with Codex Sinaiticus and Codex Vaticanus (in 14 out of 16 textual variants).

According to Comfort, 𝔓49 and 𝔓65 came from the same manuscript. Both manuscripts have the same measurements, and the same number of lines per page. Both were written by a documentary hand, both manifest the same formation of certain letters, such as titled lambda, titled sigma, extended iota, and toiled ypsilon. The nomina sacra and abbreviations are written in the same rather unusual way. Bradford Welles remarks that "there is not a single case of difference in the letter shapes in the two papyri". Neither use ligatures. The only difference is in the number of letters per line: 𝔓65 has more letters per line (42). The same situation exists in Papyrus 75. The scribe of 𝔓75 appears to have realized that he was running out of room in his codex and added three letters in each line and even added extra lines. The manuscript may be one of the earliest manuscripts to display a complete Pauline codex, along with Papyrus 13, Papyrus 15/Papyrus 16, Papyrus 30, Papyrus 46, and Papyrus 92.

 Textual variants

In Ephesians 4:23, 𝔓49 has the rare textual reading  (in spirit) instead of the reading  (spirit). The reading of the codex is supported by Codex Vaticanus, minuscule 33, 1175, 1739, 1881 and several other manuscripts.

The rest of the manuscripts have the readings: το αγαθον (Porphyrianus, minuscule 6, 33, 1739, 1881); το αγαθον ταις χερσιν (Angelicus, Athous Lavrensis, 323, 326, 614, 630, 945); το αγαθον ταις ιδιαις χερσιν (Codex Mosquensis I, 2495); ταις ιδιαις χερσιν το αγαθον (Codex Sinaiticus, Alexandrinus, Codex Bezae, Augiensis, Boernerianus, 81, 104, 365, 1175, 1241, 2464, vgcl).

In Ephesians 5:5, it has the textual reading ο εστιν (who is), supported by the manuscripts: , Sinaiticus, Vaticanus, Augiensis, Boernerianus, Athous Lavrensis, 33, 365, 1175, 1739, 1881, 2464, Old-Latin, Peshitta, Coptic manuscripts (Sahidic and Bohairic); the other reading ος εστιν (who is) is supported by Codex Alexandrinus, Codex Bezae, and manuscripts of the Byzantine textual tradition.

In Ephesians 5:9, it has the textual reading φωτος (light), supported by Codex Sinaiticus, Alexandrinus, Vaticanus, Bezae, Augiensis, Boernerianus, Porphyrianus, minuscule 6, 33, 81, 629, 1175c, 1739, 1881, 2464, some Old-Latin manuscripts, Peshitta and Coptic manuscripts. The reading πνευματος (spirit) is found in the manuscripts , D2, Ψ, majority of the Byzantine manuscripts and syrh.

History 
The handwriting of the manuscript displays many third-century features. Comfort dated the manuscript to the middle of the third century. It is presently assigned to the third century on palaeographic grounds by the Institute for New Testament Textual Research (INTF). It was probably written in Egypt, but it cannot be assigned to any particular locality.

The manuscript was purchased in Cairo for Yale University in February 1931. Its provenance prior to Cairo is not known. Currently it is housed at the Yale University Library (P. Yale 415) in New Haven.

The text of the codex was published by William Hatch and Bradford Welles in 1958 (editio princeps). Kurt Aland catalogued the manuscript on the list of the New Testament papyri under the number 49.
Susan Stephens gave a new and complete transcription of the codex in 1985. Comfort and Barrett again gave a new reconstruction in 1999.

Vittorio Bartoletti (1920–1990) was the first to note that Papyrus 49 and Papyrus 65 were produced by the same scribe. This conclusion was confirmed by Bradford Welles, Comfort and Barrett, and other palaeographers. They are still catalogued as separate manuscripts on the INTF's list.

Text 

[recto (Eph 4:16-25)]
 [16] – [οικοδομην εαυτου] ε̣ν̣ αγαπ[η [17] το]υ̣το̣ ο̣υ̣ν λ̣[εγω και
 μαρτυρομ]α̣ι εν κ̅ω̅ μη̣κετι υ[μας π]ε̣ρ̣[ι]π̣ατ[ειν καθ]
 [ως και τα] ε̣θνη ·περιπατει εν̣ [ματαιοτ]η̣τ̣ι του
 [νοος] αυτων [18] εσκοτωμενοι τη ·δ[ια]νο̣ι̣α οντες
 [απηλ]λοτριωμ̣ενοι της ζωης του θ̅υ̅ δ̣ια την αγνοι
 [αν τη]ν̣ ουσαν εν ·αυτοις δια τ̣η̣[ν πωρ]ω̣σιν της
 [καρδια]ς αυ̣των̣ [19] οιτινες απηλ[γηκοτες] ε̣αυτους
 [παρεδ]ω̣καν τη̣ ·α̣σελγια ε̣ι[ς] εργα̣[σιαν] α̣καθαρ
 [σιας πασης εν πλεο]ν̣ε̣ξ̣ια [20] υμ̣[εις δε] ο̣υ̣χ̣ ουτως
 [εμαθετε τον χ̅̅ν̅ [21] ει γε] α̣υτον ηκ̣[ουσατ]ε̣ και εν αυτω
 [εδιδαχθητε καθως εστι]ν̣ α̣λ̣η̣θ̣ε̣ι̣α̣ ε̣ν̣ [τω] ι̣̅̅υ̅ [22] [α]π̣οθεσθε
 [υμας κατα τη]ν̣ προ[τεραν α]ναστροφη̣[ν το]ν̣ παλαιον αν
 [θρωπον τον] φ̣θ̣ε̣ι̣ρομενον κατα τα[ς ε]π̣ιθυμιας της
 [απατης [23] ανα]νεο̣υσθαι δε εν τω π̅ν̣̅[ι̅ το]υ νοος ·υμων
 [24] [και ενδυσασ]θ̣α̣ι̣ τ̣ον καινον ανθ̣[ρωπο]ν̣ τον κατα
 [θ̅ν̅ κτισ]θ̣εντ̣α εν δικαιοσυνη̣ τ̣ι̣ της αλη
 [θειας [25] δι]ο̣ αποθ̣εμενοι το ψευδ̣[ος λαλει]τ̣[α]ι̣ ·αληθειαν
 [εκαστος μ]ε̣τ̣α του̣ πλησιον αυτ̣[ου οτι εσμεν] α̣λ̣λ̣η̣λ̣ων
 [μελη [26] ο]ρ̣γιζ̣ε̣σθαι και μη̣ αμαρ̣τ̣αν[ετ]α̣ι ο ηλιος
 [μη επ]ι̣δυετω επι παρο̣[ργ]ι̣σμω ·υμω̣ν̣ [27] μηδε
 [διδοτε τ]οπον τω διαβολ̣ω̣ [28] ο κλεπτων μηκετει
 [κλεπτετ]ω μαλλον δ[ε κ]ο̣πιατω εργ̣[α]ζ̣ομενος
 [ταις χερσι]ν̣ το ·αγαθον ινα εχη με̣[τα]δ̣ιδο̣να̣ι
 [τω χρεια]ν̣ ·εχοντι [29] πας λογος σαπρος [ε]κ̣ του στομα
 τος υμων

[verso (Eph 4:29-5:13)]
 ρισατο ημ[ιν [1] γιν]ε[σθ]ε̣ ουν μιμηται του θ̅υ̅ ω̣ς̣ τ̣ε̣[κνα] αγα
 πητα [2] κα̣[ι] π̣ε̣[ρι]πατειται εν αγαπη καθως κ[αι]
 ο χ̅ς̅ ηγαπησε[ν] ·[ημ]ας και παρεδωκε[ν] εαυτον [υπερ]
 ημων πρ̣ο[σφορα]ν̣ κ̣α̣ι θυσιαν τω θ̅ω̅ ε̣[ι]ς̣ οσμη[ν ·ευω]
 διας [3] πορν[εια] [δε] κ̣αι ακαθαρσια πασα̣ η ·π̣λ̣ε[ο
 ν]εξεια μη̣δ̣[ε ονο]μ̣αζεσθω εν υμιν̣ [κ]α̣θως π[ρεπει] ·
 αγιοις [4] και εσ̣[χροτ]ης και μ̣ω̣[ρολογια η ευτραπελια α]
 ουκ α̣νηκεν̣ α̣λ̣λ̣[α μ]α̣λ̣[λον ευχαριστια [5] τουτο γαρ]
 ειστε γιν̣ωσκ̣[ο]ντ̣[ες] οτι π̣α̣[ς πορνος η ακ]α[θαρτος]
 η πλεονεκτη̣ς̣ ο̣ [εσ]τ̣ιν ειδωλο̣λ̣α̣τ̣ρ̣η̣ς̣ ου̣[κ εχει]
 κληρονομεια εν̣ [τη] βασιλεια του χυ̅ κ̣α̣ι θ̅υ̣̅ [6] [μηδεις]
 υμας απ̣ατατ̣ω̣ [κε]ν̣οις ·λογοις δια τ̣α̣υτ̣α̣ [γαρ ερχε]
 τε η̣ οργη του̣ θ̣[υ̅ επι] τους̣ υ̣ιο̣υς της απισ̣τι̣α[ς [7] μη]
 ουν γινεσθ̣[ε συμμετ]οχ̣[οι] ·α̣υ̣των [8] ητε γαρ π̣[οτε]
 σκοτος ν[υν δε φω]ς̣ ε̣ν̣ ·κ̅ω̅ ως̣ τεκ̣[ν]α φ̣[ωτος πε]
 ριπατειτ̣ε̣ [9] [ο γαρ] [καρπ]ο̣ς̣ τ̣ο̣υ φωτος εν πα̣[ση αγα]
 θοσυνη και δ̣[ικα]ιοσυν̣η κ̣α̣ι̣ αληθεια [10] δ̣οκι[μα]
 ζοντες τι εστ̣[ι]ν ευα̣ρεσ[το]ν̣ τω κ̅ω̅ [11] και μη [συγ]
 κοινωνειται το̣ις εργοις τ[οις] α̣καρποις του σ̣κ̣[οτους]
 μαλλον δε κ̣[α]ι̣ ελλεγχετ̣[ε] [12] τ̣α κρυφη γινο̣[μενα]
 υπ ·αυτων [αι]σχ̣ρον εστιν και ·λεγειν [13] τα̣ [δε] [παν]
 τα ελλεγχο[μ]ενα υπο του φωτος φανερ[ουται]

See also 
 List of New Testament papyri

References

Further reading 
 W. H. P. Hatch and C. Bradford Welles, A Hitherto Unpublished Fragment of the Epistle to the Ephesians, Harvard Theological Review LI (1958), pp. 33–37.

External links 

 Image 𝔓49 recto
 Image 𝔓49 verso

New Testament papyri
3rd-century biblical manuscripts
Early Greek manuscripts of the New Testament
Epistle to the Ephesians papyri